Lynchburg City Schools, also known as Lynchburg City Public Schools, is a public school district in Lynchburg, Virginia.  It began operation on April 5, 1871.

It has over 9,000 students enrolled in preschool through adult classes in two high schools, three middle schools, and eleven elementary schools. The district also provides alternative elementary, middle and high school programs, gifted programs, and programs for the disabled.

High schools
E. C. Glass High School
Heritage High School

Middle schools
Linkhorne Middle School
Paul Laurence Dunbar Middle School for Innovation
Sandusky Middle School

Elementary schools
William Marvin Bass Elementary School
Bedford Hills Elementary School
Dearing Elementary School for Innovation
Heritage Elementary School
Linkhorne Elementary School
Paul Munro Elementary School
Perrymont Elementary School
Robert S. Payne Elementary School
Sandusky Elementary School
Sheffield Elementary School
Thomas C. Miller Elementary School for Innovation

Alternative education
Amelia Pride Center
Fort Hill Community School

Special education
Laurel Regional Program

School board
The school district is managed by a nine member school board, three from each of the three component districts.

References

External links
Lynchburg City Schools Website

School divisions in Virginia
Education in Lynchburg, Virginia